Jason's Letter is a 2017 American independent drama film starring Vivica A. Fox.

Plot

Cast
Vivica A. Fox as Sammi Brooks
Quinton Aaron as Troy James Sr.
Michael Paré as Brad Macaulay
Joseph R. Gannascoli as Principle (Pratt) Prattoli
Claudia Jordan as Mattie James
Brian Hooks as Melvin Jacks
Nakia Dillard as Uncle Tony
Jamol Manigault as Jason McKey
Thomas Walton as Officer Zinman

Production
The film was shot in Dover, Delaware in January 2017.  Certain locations where principal photography occurred included the Dover Public Library and City Hall, especially the mayor's office.

Release
The film made its premiere on June 11, 2017 at the Schwartz Center for the Arts in Dover.

References

External links
 
 

American independent films
American drama films
Films shot in Delaware
2010s English-language films
2010s American films